Wright's short-legged skink (Brachymeles wrighti) is a species of skink endemic to the Philippines.

References

Reptiles of the Philippines
Reptiles described in 1925
Brachymeles
Taxa named by Edward Harrison Taylor